The Peterborough Pets were a Canadian football franchise in the early 20th century.  They played in the Ontario Rugby Football Union.  Their greatest success came in 1907 when they won the ORFU title and advanced to the Canadian Dominion Final.  They were soundly defeated 75-10 by the Montreal Football Club in the final that year.

References

https://web.archive.org/web/20110727185339/http://www.profootballresearchers.org/Coffin_Corner/07-An-245.pdf

Ontario Rugby Football Union teams
Sport in Peterborough, Ontario
Canadian football teams in Ontario
Defunct Canadian football teams
1904 establishments in Ontario
1909 disestablishments in Ontario
Sports clubs established in 1904
Sports clubs disestablished in 1909